3,4,5-Tri-O-galloylquinic acid is a hydrolysable tannin found in Lepidobotrys staudtii, in Guiera senegalensis or in the resurrection plant (Myrothamnus flabellifolius).

It is classified as a natural product with anti-HIV activity and a DNA polymerase inhibitor.

References 

Gallotannins
Trihydroxybenzoic acids
Quinic acid esters
Pyrogallols